The Gold Rush Stakes is an American Thoroughbred horse race for two-year-olds run at Golden Gate Fields in mid-December.  An ungraded stakes set at distance of one mile on Tapeta Footings, the Gold Rush currently offers a purse of $75,000.

The race, named for the California Gold Rush of 1849, is a steppingstone to the $100,000 Golden Gate Derby (gr. III).

Past winners

 2016 - Colonel Samsen (1:38.59) (Juan J. Hernandez) (trainer Eoin G. Harty)
 2015 - Mana Strike (1:38.36) (Pedro M. Terrero) (trainer Frank Lucarelli)
 2014 - Stand and Salute (1:39.26) (Russell Baze) (trainer Jerry Hollendorfer) 
 2013 - Exit Stage Left (1:38.53) (Russell Baze) (trainer Jerry Hollendorfer)
 2012 - Zeewat (1:38:13) (Russell Baze) (trainer Jerry Hollendorfer)
 2011 - Russian Greek (1:39.18) (Inoel Beato) (trainer Jerry Hollendorfer)
 2010 - Positive Response (1:37.75)
 2009 - Sourdough Sam (1:39.39)
 2008 - Merus Miami (1:38.48) (Alex Bisono)
 2007 – El Gato Malo (1:37.62) (Patrick Valenzuela)
 2006 – Pure As Gold (Jon Court)
 2005 – 
 2004 – Dover Dere (1:36.55) (Ignacio Puglisi)
 2003 – Skipaslew (Eric Saint-Martin)
 2002 – Spensive
 2001 - Danthebluegrassman (1:34.69)
 2000 - I’madrifter
 1995 - Petionville
 1994 - Bai Brun
 1992 - Big Pal
 1990 - Restless Con (won the 1990 Haskell Invitational Handicap)
 1989 – Avenging Force (Roberto Gonzalez)
 1988 - Prospectors Gamble (a leading sire of 1999)

External links
 Golden Gate Fields website
 Photos of Golden Gate Fields, including Silky Sullivan memorial and Lost in the Fog

Horse races in California
Golden Gate Fields
Ungraded stakes races in the United States
Flat horse races for two-year-olds